The 1972-73 Buffalo Braves season was the 3rd season of the Buffalo Braves of the National Basketball Association (NBA). Despite finishing with a worse record than their previous 2 seasons, their 21–61 record was good enough for 3rd place. The Braves showed improvement under new Coach Jack Ramsay. Rookie center Bob McAdoo provided the silver lining by winning the Rookie of the Year Award with 18.0 points per game and 9.1 rebounds per game.

During the fifth game of the season versus the Boston Celtics on October 20, 1972, the team set an NBA record which still stands for most points in a single quarter with 58, and still managed to lose 126-118.

Draft picks

Roster
{| class="toccolours" style="font-size: 95%; width: 100%;"
|-
! colspan="2" style="background-color: #000000;  color: #F15110; text-align: center;" | Buffalo Braves 1972-73 roster
|- style="background-color: #F15110; color: #000000;   text-align: center;"
! Players !! Coaches
|-
| valign="top" |
{| class="sortable" style="background:transparent; margin:0px; width:100%;"
! Pos. !! # !! Nat. !! Name !! Ht. !! Wt. !! From
|-

Roster Notes
 Center Cornell Warner and guard Walt Hazzard played in only 4 games and 9 games respectively before being waived in November.
 Guard Harold Fox played in only 10 games before being waived in December.
 Guard Dave Wohl came back to the franchise, now known as the Los Angeles Clippers, as an assistant coach from 1993–94 and as its general manager from 2014–2017.

Regular season

Season standings

Record vs. opponents

Game log

Player statistics
Note: GP= Games Played; MPG = Minutes per game; FG% = Field goal percentage; FT% = Free throw percentage; RPG = Rebounds per game; APG = Assists per game; PPG = Points per game

Awards and honors
 Bob Kauffman, NBA All-Star
 Bob McAdoo, NBA Rookie of the Year

Transactions
The Braves were involved in the following transactions during the 1972–73 season.

Coaching Change

Trades

Free agents

Additions

Subtractions

References

 Braves on Database Basketball
 Braves on Basketball Reference

Buffalo
Buffalo Braves seasons
Buffalo
Buffalo